Neopyrochroa is a genus of fire-colored beetles in the family Pyrochroidae. There are at least three described species in Neopyrochroa.

Species
These three species belong to the genus Neopyrochroa:
 Neopyrochroa californica (Horn, 1891) b
 Neopyrochroa femoralis (LeConte, 1855) g b
 Neopyrochroa flabellata (Fabricius, 1787) g b
Data sources: g = GBIF, b = Bugguide.net

References

Further reading

External links

 

Pyrochroidae